Michele Cucuzza (born in 1952) is an Italian journalist, news speaker and television presenter.

Born in Catania, the son of the volcanologist , Cucuzza became professional journalist in 1979 and he started his career for the radio Radio Popolare. In 1985 he became a collaborator of RAI TV, working as a redactor, a correspondent and for about ten years as a news speaker of TG2. In 1998 he became the presenter of La Vita in diretta, a Rai 1 infotainment program broadcast in the afternoon. He considers himself a "dubious Christian."

References

External links 

Living people
Journalists from Catania
Italian male journalists
1952 births
Italian television presenters
Mass media people from Catania
Italian Christians